Mihails Zemļinskis (born 21 December 1969) is a Latvian politician and former professional footballer. He played as a centre-back or sweeper, making over 100 appearances for the Latvia national team.

Football career
Zemļinskis spent most of his career at Skonto FC except for short periods at FC Dnipro Dnipropetrovsk, at BVSC Budapest and at Hapoel Kfar Saba. He was a skilled central defender and played for the Latvia national team after country regained its independence in 1991. He played 105 matches and scored 12 goals for the national team, and took part in the 2004 European Championships in Portugal. Zemļinskis wore the number 4 jersey. He eventually became a football coach at FC Daugava. He is also a former head coach of the Latvia U21 team.

Political career
Since 2009 he has been a member of the Latvian parliament Saeima for the social democratic party "Harmony". According to a request made to the European Parliament, Zemļinskis was listed as a member of the Coalition pour la Vie et la Famille (CPVF) at the European level, a hodgepodge European party of conservative, extreme right, populist, eurosceptic, regionalist and neonazi members of national and regional parliaments from seven EU countries. This was at odds with his national party's associate membership of the party of European Socialists and its only member of European parliament being a member of the party of European Socialists. As of 19 April 2018, Zemļinskis was listed as a member of the Alliance for Peace and Freedom since 15 September 2015 in that European party's declaration of representatives registered with the Authority for European Political Parties and European Political Foundations.

Honours
Skonto Riga
 Baltic Cup: 1993, 1995
 Latvian Champion (11): 1992, 1993, 1994, 1995, 1998, 1999, 2000, 2001, 2002, 2003, 2004

Individual
 Latvian Footballer of the Year: 1998

See also
 List of men's footballers with 100 or more international caps

References

External links
 Latvian Football Federation 
 

1969 births
Living people
Latvian people of Ukrainian descent
Footballers from Riga
Social Democratic Party "Harmony" politicians
Deputies of the 9th Saeima
Deputies of the 10th Saeima
Deputies of the 11th Saeima
Deputies of the 12th Saeima
Latvian footballers
Ukrainian footballers
Association football defenders
Latvia international footballers
FIFA Century Club
UEFA Euro 2004 players
Latvian Higher League players
FC Dnipro players
Skonto FC players
Budapesti VSC footballers
Hapoel Kfar Saba F.C. players
Latvian expatriate footballers
Latvian expatriate sportspeople in Hungary
Expatriate footballers in Hungary
Latvian expatriate sportspeople in Israel
Expatriate footballers in Israel
Politicians from Riga